Crnogorac may refer to:

 native name of a female person of Montenegrin ethnicity
 native name of a female person of Montenegrin citizenship
 Crnogorka (dance), folk dance from the Crna Gora region, north of Skopje
 Crnogorka, a former newspaper in Montenegro, issued from 1884 to 1885
 Crnogorka, a South Slavic female given name

See also
 Crnogorac (disambiguation)
 Montenegro (disambiguation)
 Montenegrin (disambiguation)
 Montenegrins (disambiguation)